

The German School of Army Aviation (Heeresfliegerwaffenschule) based at Bückeburg, is one of the schools of the German Army and is responsible for the training and development of the German Army Aviation Corps' personnel and equipment. Furthermore, the basic training of helicopter pilots of the other components of the German Armed Forces also takes place at the School of Army Aviation.

The School of Army Aviation was founded on 1 July 1959 and based first at Mendig before being transferred on 12 January 1960 to its current location at Bückeburg Air Base, utilising the facilities of RAF Bückeburg, constructed by the Royal Air Force in 1946 and closed in the mid-1950s.

In October 2011 the German Federal Ministry of Defence announced a reorganisation/reduction of the German Armed Forces. Due to the reduction of helicopter units within the German Army, some of which are to be disbanded whereas others are to be transferred to the German Air Force, and also in light of the already existing international character of training helicopter pilots, the School of Army Aviation (Heeresfliegerwaffenschule) will be renamed to International Helicopter Training Centre. Training of helicopter pilots of the other components of the German Armed Forces (Air Force and Navy) at Bückeburg  started in 2011.

Organisation 
The head and commanding officer the German School of Army Aviation has the rank of brigadier general and the position of General of the Army Aviation Corps (General der Heeresflieger). The school is structured in:

 Staff
 Support Group
 Technical Maintenance Department
 Development Group
 Instruction Group

Staff of the German Armed Forces' Central Medical Services, amongst which are a high-ranking flight surgeon and flight psychologist, are also incorporated into the school.

Apart from the actual flight training, modern high-end flight simulators are extensively used during the training of future military helicopter pilots.

Together with the French Army Light Aviation the Franco-German Training Centre TIGER at Le Luc – Le Cannet Airport in Le Cannet-des-Maures was established, solely dedicated to provide flying instruction on the new helicopter Eurocopter Tiger.

Units 

 * (disbanded on 31 December 2008)

See also
 Army Aviation School
 German Army Aviation Corps
 History of the German Army Aviation Corps
 German Army
 Army aviation

References

Further reading

External links 
  Official website of the German Army Aviation School (in German)

Units and formations of the German Army (1956–present)
Aviation schools
German army aviation
Military education and training in Germany
Army flying training units and formations